Limnius is a genus of beetles belonging to the family Elmidae.

Species:
 Limnius aegyptiacus Kuwert, 1890
 Limnius avalis

References

Elmidae